Faroese (føroyskt mál ) is a North Germanic language spoken as a first language by about 72,000 Faroe Islanders, around 50,000 of whom reside on the Faroe Islands and some 22,000 in other areas, mainly Denmark.

It is one of five languages descended from Old West Norse spoken in the Middle Ages, the others being Norwegian, Icelandic, and the extinct Norn and Greenlandic Norse. Faroese and Icelandic, its closest extant relative, are not mutually intelligible in speech, but the written languages resemble each other quite closely, largely owing to Faroese's etymological orthography.

History

Around 900 AD, the language spoken in the Faroes was Old Norse, which Norse settlers had brought with them during the time of the settlement of Faroe Islands that began in 825. However, many of the settlers were not from Scandinavia, but descendants of Norse settlers in the Irish Sea region. In addition, women from Norse Ireland, Orkney, or Shetland often married native Scandinavian men before settling in the Faroe Islands and Iceland. As a result, the Irish language has had some influence on both Faroese and Icelandic. 

There is speculation about Irish language place names in the Faroes: for example, the names of Mykines, Stóra Dímun, Lítla Dímun and Argir have been hypothesized to contain Celtic roots. Other examples of early-introduced words of Celtic origin are: / (buttermilk), cf. Middle Irish ;  (tail-piece of an animal), cf. Middle Irish ;  (head, headhair), cf. Middle Irish ;  (hand, paw), cf. Middle Irish ;  (bull), cf. Middle Irish .

Between the 9th and the 15th centuries, a distinct Faroese language evolved, although it was probably still mutually intelligible with Old West Norse, and remained similar to the Norn language of Orkney and Shetland during Norn's earlier phase.

Faroese ceased to be a written language after the union of Norway with Denmark in 1380, with Danish replacing Faroese as the language of administration and education. The islanders continued to use the language in ballads, folktales, and everyday life. This maintained a rich spoken tradition, but for 300 years the language was not used in written form.

In 1823, the Danish Bible Society published a diglot of the Gospel of Matthew, with Faroese on the left and Danish on the right.

Venceslaus Ulricus Hammershaimb and the Icelandic grammarian and politician Jón Sigurðsson published a written standard for Modern Faroese in 1854, which still exists. They set a standard for the orthography of the language, based on its Old Norse roots and similar to that of Icelandic. The main purpose of this was for the spelling to represent the diverse dialects of Faroese in equal measure. Additionally, it had the advantages of being etymologically clear and keeping the kinship with the Icelandic written language. The actual pronunciation, however, often differs considerably from the written rendering. The letter ð, for example, has no specific phoneme attached to it.

Jakob Jakobsen devised a rival system of orthography, based on his wish for a phonetic spelling, but this system was never taken up by the speakers.

In 1908, Scripture Gift Mission published the Gospel of John in Faroese.

In 1937, Faroese replaced Danish as the official school language, in 1938, as the church language, and in 1948, as the national language by the Home Rule Act of the Faroe Islands.  Today, Danish is considered a foreign language, and it is taught in school from the first grade.

In 2017, the tourist board Visit Faroe Islands launched a website entitled Faroe Islands Translate. Text can be entered in thirteen languages, including English, Chinese, Russian, Japanese, French, Spanish, and Portuguese. Instead of an instant machine translation being given, the text goes to a volunteer who will provide a live video translation, or else a recorded one later. The aim of this project was to get Faroese featured on Google Translate.

Old Faroese 

Old Faroese (ca. mid-14th to mid-16th centuries) is a form of Old Norse spoken in medieval times in the Faroe Islands. The most crucial aspects of the development of Faroese are diphthongisation and palatalisation.

There is not enough data available to establish an accurate chronology of Faroese, but a rough one may be developed through comparison to the chronologies of Old Icelandic and Old Norwegian. Further, the language underwent a palatalisation of k, g and sk before Old Norse e, i, y, ø, au >  >  > .

A massive quantity shift also operated in Middle Faroese. In the case of skerping, it took place after delabialization but before loss of post-vocalic ð and g . Another undated change is the merger of ǫ, ø and ǿ into ; pre-nasal ǫ, ǫ́ > o, ó. enk, eng probably became ,  in the 14th century; the development of a to  before ng, nk appeared after the palatalisation of k, g, and sk had been completed, such a change is quite a recent development, as well as change Cve > Cvø.

Alphabet 

The Faroese alphabet consists of 29 letters derived from the Latin script:

Phonology 

As with most other Germanic languages, Faroese has a large number of vowels, with 26 in total. Vowel distribution is similar to other North Germanic languages in that short vowels appear in closed syllables (those ending in consonant clusters or long consonants) and long vowels appearing in open syllables.

Faroese shares with Icelandic and Danish the feature of maintaining a contrast between stops based exclusively on aspiration, not voicing. Geminated stops may be pre-aspirated in intervocalic and word-final position. Intervocalically the aspirated consonants become pre-aspirated unless followed by a closed vowel. In clusters, the preaspiration merges with a preceding nasal or apical approximant, rendering them voiceless.

There are several phonological processes involved in Faroese, including:
Nasals generally assume the place of articulation and laryngeal settings of following consonants.
Velar stops palatalize to postalveolar affricates before  and 
 becomes  before voiceless consonants
 becomes  after  and before 
All long voiceless stops are pre-aspirated when doubled or in clusters .

Grammar

Faroese grammar is related and very similar to that of modern Icelandic and Old Norse. Faroese is an inflected language with three grammatical genders and four cases: nominative, accusative, dative and genitive.

See also 
Faroese language conflict
Goidelic languages
Gøtudanskt accent
Old Norwegian

Further reading

To learn Faroese as a language

Adams, Jonathan & Hjalmar P. Petersen. Faroese: A Language Course for beginners Grammar & Textbook. Tórshavn, 2009: Stiðin (704 p.) 
W. B. Lockwood: An Introduction to Modern Faroese. Tórshavn, 1977. (no ISBN, 244 pages, 4th printing 2002)
Michael Barnes: Faroese Language Studies Studia Nordica 5, Supplementum 30. Tórshavn, 2002. (239 pages) 
Höskuldur Thráinsson (Þráinsson), Hjalmar P. Petersen, Jógvan í Lon Jacobsen, Zakaris Svabo Hansen: Faroese. An Overview and Reference Grammar. Tórshavn, 2004. (500 pages) 
Richard Kölbl: Färöisch Wort für Wort. Bielefeld 2004 (in German)
Faroeseonline.com

Dictionaries

Johan Hendrik W. Poulsen: Føroysk orðabók. Tórshavn, 1998. (1483 pages)  (in Faroese)
Annfinnur í Skála / Jonhard Mikkelsen: Føroyskt / enskt – enskt / føroyskt, Vestmanna: Sprotin 2008. (Faroese–English / English–Faroese dictionary, 2 volumes)
Annfinnur í Skála: Donsk-føroysk orðabók. Tórshavn 1998. (1369 pages)  (Danish–Faroese dictionary)
M.A. Jacobsen, Chr. Matras: Føroysk–donsk orðabók. Tórshavn, 1961. (no ISBN, 521 pages, Faroese–Danish dictionary)
Hjalmar Petersen, Marius Staksberg: Donsk–Føroysk orðabók. Tórshavn, 1995. (879 p.)  (Danish–Faroese dictionary)
Eigil Lehmann: Føroysk–norsk orðabók. Tórshavn, 1987 (no ISBN, 388 p.) (Faroese–Norwegian dictionary)
Jón Hilmar Magnússon: Íslensk-færeysk orðabók. Reykjavík, 2005. (877 p.)  (Icelandic–Faroese dictionary)
Gianfranco Contri: Dizionario faroese-italiano = Føroysk-italsk orðabók. Tórshavn, 2004. (627 p.)  (Faroese–Italian dictionary)

Faroese literature and research

V.U. Hammershaimb: Færøsk Anthologi. Copenhagen 1891 (no ISBN, 2 volumes, 4th printing, Tórshavn 1991) (editorial comments in Danish)
Tórður Jóansson: English loanwords in Faroese. Tórshavn, 1997. (243 pages) 
Petersen, Hjalmar P. 2009. Gender Assignment in Modern Faroese. Hamborg. Kovac
Petersen, Hjalmar P. 2010. The Dynamics of Faroese-Danish Language Contact. Heidelberg. Winter
Faroese/German anthology "From Djurhuus to Poulsen – Faroese Poetry during 100 Years", academic advice: Turið Sigurðardóttir, linear translation: Inga Meincke (2007), ed. by Paul Alfred Kleinert

Other

References

Footnotes

Citations

External links 

 Faroese-English dictionary
 Faroese online syntactic analyser and morphological analyser/generator
 FMN.fo – Faroese Language Committee (Official site with further links)
 Useful Faroese Words & Phrases for Travelers 
 How to count in Faroese
Faroe Island Translate

 
Languages of Denmark
West Scandinavian languages
Subject–verb–object languages
Verb-second languages
Language
Stress-timed languages
Vulnerable languages